Nutricia is a specialized medical nutrition company. It is part of the Medical Nutrition Division of Groupe Danone, Paris. Nutricia manufactures products used in the management of severe allergic and gastrointestinal disorders, metabolic conditions as well as other conditions requiring nutritional therapy, including intractable epilepsy.

Among other products, Nutricia manufactures Neocate, an amino acid-based, hypoallergenic formula for the dietary management of milk protein allergy available in North America. Despite evidence that Neocate can lead to a "hungry bone syndrome," calcium and phosphorus issues, and pathologic fractures when it is the sole source of an infant or child's nutrition, the company has repeatedly blown off those who suggest that they investigate and address this issue. The company also manufactures Lorenzo's oil, an alternative medicine for a rare neurological disease called adrenoleukodystrophy (ALD) that was featured in the 1992 movie Lorenzo's Oil. Nutricia provides Lorenzo's oil to patients at cost.

History 

Nutricia North America, Inc. (formerly known as SHS North America) was established in 1983. From 1983 until 1997, the company was a subsidiary of Royal Numico N.V. In 2007, Royal Numico was purchased by Groupe Danone, Paris. Nutricia North America is headquartered in Rockville, MD.

See also
Milk allergy
Phenylketonuria
Ketogenic diet
SHS International

References

External links
Nutricia North America Web Site
Company Snapshot - BusinessWeek
Company Overview - BioPortfolio
Danone 2007 Annual Report
Danone Offers $17 Billion For Food Firm Numico - Reuters
U.S. Food and Drug Administration Frequently Asked Questions About Medical Foods

Companies based in Rockville, Maryland
Food and drink companies of the United States
Companies established in 1983